Rudzani Ramudzuli (born 10 May 1983 in Nzhelele, Transvaal) is a South African association footballer, who last plays for Supersport United in the Premier Soccer League.

References 

1983 births
Living people
People from Makhado Local Municipality
South African Venda people
South African soccer players
Association football midfielders
Association football forwards
Orlando Pirates F.C. players
SuperSport United F.C. players
Black Leopards F.C. players
Sportspeople from Limpopo